Philip Wilkinson, (b. 1977), is an entrepreneur living in London, England. He founded his first company, Shopgenie, which became Kelkoo in 1998.    Subsequently, he founded vertical search comparison company, Genie Group, and in 2006, the  Social shopping site Crowdstorm.

References
 Philip Wilkinson on web 2.0 and social shopping (e-consultancy interview)
 Philip Wilkinson on evolution of e-commerce Video
 Kopi Coffee Club
 Crowdstorm
 Broadband Genie

Living people
English businesspeople
1977 births